Roland Bock (born 3 August 1944) is a German wrestler. He competed in the men's Greco-Roman +97 kg at the 1968 Summer Olympics.

References

External links
 

1944 births
Living people
German male sport wrestlers
Olympic wrestlers of West Germany
Wrestlers at the 1968 Summer Olympics